Robert Williams (c. 1695–1763), of Erbistock, Denbighshire, was a Welsh politician.

Williams was the second son of Sir William Williams, 2nd Baronet. He was a Member (MP) of the Parliament of England for Montgomeryshire on 12 December 1740 – 1741 and 2 April 1742 – 1747.

References

1695 births
1763 deaths
People from Wrexham County Borough
Members of the Parliament of Great Britain for Welsh constituencies
British MPs 1734–1741
British MPs 1741–1747